The Miloš Žutić Award is an eminent Serbian award given by the Serbian Union of Dramatists, to actors with notable theatre roles. Presented since 1994, it is named after successful theatre actor Miloš Žutić.

The recipients of this accolade include critically and commercially acclaimed performers, including Goran Jevtić, Branislav Lečić, Bojan Žirović, Boris Milivojević, Vojin Ćetković and Nebojša Glogovac, who won the award two times, setting a record.

Laureats

References 

Serbian theatre awards
Theatre acting awards